Roland B. Kai is a Liberian politician and since 2018, the current superintendent of Grand Gedeh's Konobo District.

See also
Politics of Liberia

References

21st-century Liberian politicians
Living people
Place of birth missing (living people)
Year of birth missing (living people)
People from Grand Gedeh County